Konakalla Narayana Rao (born 4 May 1950)  is an Indian politician, who worked for the Telugu Desam Party. He was elected to the Lok Sabha from the Machilipatnam constituency in Andhra Pradesh in the 2009 and 2014 elections.  He is often associated with many social and cultural activities and is known to organize theater competition in the native town of Machilipatnam.

Before Politics

Konakalla Narayana Rao started his career as a contractor, and later moved on to becoming an agriculturist. He has always maintained a close relationship with members of Machilipatnam people and the Gowd community. He was well known for his diligent efforts to elevate the livelihoods of the poor and backward classes in his community. More specifically, he worked to help the fishermen community, members of the scheduled caste, and the scheduled tribes in Machalipatnam. For the last 30 years he has been the President of the National Mazdoor Trade Union at the RTC Depot of Machilipatnam (Krishna District). He has maintained a good relationship with the blue-collar workers and has helped solve many problems the workers faced.

Political career 
Konakalla Narayana Rao is a part of the Telugu Desam Party. In the 2009 & 2014 (15th and 16th Lok Sabha) elections he was elected to the Lok Sabha from the Machilipatnam constituency: Krishna District in Andhra Pradesh. Konakalla Narayana Rao was appointed as a panel speaker within the Lok Sabha, also known as the Panel of Chairpersons. Konakalla Narayana Rao occupied a place in the hierarchy which is next to the Deputy Speaker of the house. In the 15th Lok Sabha (2009) he appointed as member of the Committee on Petroleum and Natural Gas.

At the Lok Sabha he was on the Committee on Petroleum and Natural Gas
3 May 2013 	Member, Committee on Welfare of Other Backward Classes (OBCs)
May, 2014 	Re-elected to 16th Lok Sabha (2nd term)
12 June 2014 onwards 	Member, House Committee
1 Sep. 2014 onwards 	Member, Standing Committee on Agriculture.

Election Results

Development Activities 
While contesting  the Lok Sabha elections, Konakalla Narayana Rao promised to deliver results on long pending projects within the Parliamentary Constituency of Machilipatnam. His election promises include: re-establishing the Machilipatnam port re-establishment, Machilipatnam-Gudivada-Vijayawada Railway Doubling and Electrification, the creation of a new Machilipatnam–Repalle railway line, modernizing of the Machilipatnam Railway Station, converting NH 214A into 6 lane in Machilipatnam to Vijayawada, and converting National highway into 4 lane road from Machilipatnam to Ongole. All these projects are at various stages of implementation.

Personal life 
Konakalla Narayana Rao’s native place is Machilipatnam, Krishna district, Andhra Pradesh, was born on 4 May 1950. His father is Shri Ganapathi and his mother  is Smt. Kasi Eshwaramma. He was married to Smt. Padmaja on 30 May 1975. They have two sons, Kiran Ganapathi and Chaithanya Ganapathi.

References

External links
 Official biographical sketch in Parliament of India website

1950 births
Living people
India MPs 2009–2014
Lok Sabha members from Andhra Pradesh
People from Krishna district
India MPs 2014–2019
Telugu Desam Party politicians
Telugu politicians